Quark is a cryptographic hash function (family).
It was designed by Jean-Philippe Aumasson, Luca Henzen, Willi Meier and María Naya-Plasencia.

Quark was created because of the expressed need by application designers (notably for implementing RFID protocols) for a lightweight cryptographic hash function.
The SHA-3 NIST hash function competition concerned general-purpose designs and focused on software performance.
 
Quark is a lightweight hash function, based on a single security level and on the sponge construction, to minimize memory requirements. Inspired by the lightweight ciphers Grain and KATAN, the hash function family Quark is composed of the three instances u-Quark, d-Quark, and t-Quark. Hardware benchmarks show that Quark compares well to previous lightweight hashes.

For example, the u-Quark conjecturally instance provides at least 64-bit security against all attacks (collisions, multicollisions, distinguishers, etc.), fits in 1379 gate-equivalents, and consumes in average 2.44 µW at 100 kHz in 0.18 µm ASIC.

External links
 Quark on Jean-Philippe Aumasson's website 131002.net
 Quark on the International Association for Cryptologic Research website iacr.org

Cryptographic hash functions
Cryptography